Chittatosh Mookerjee (Born 1 January 1929) was the Chief Justice of the Calcutta and Bombay High Court, India. He is the grandson of Bengali scholar and educator Ashutosh Mukherjee and the nephew of Shyama Prasad Mookerjee.

Early life
Mookerjee was born on 1 January 1929 in Kolkata, British India. His father Rama Prasad Mukherjee was a judge of the Calcutta High Court. He passed Matriculation Examination in the First Division from Mitra Institution, Bhowanipore, got First Class in the Preliminary, Intermediate and Final Law Examinations of the Calcutta University and passed M.A. in Economics in 1951. Mookerjee entered the legal profession in November 1953.

Career
He was appointed an additional judge of the Calcutta High Court in 1969 and in 1970 he became a permanent judge of the High Court. In 1986 he was elevated as the chief justice of the Calcutta High Court and was transferred to Bombay as Chief Justice of the Bombay High Court. Mookerjee retired from judgeship in 1991. He was also the acting Governor of Maharashtra. In 1990 he was the head of tribunal for Kaveri River water dispute. After retirement he became the first chairperson of the West Bengal Human Rights Commission and served there from 1995 to 1998.

References

1929 births
Living people
20th-century Indian judges
Chief Justices of the Calcutta High Court
Chief Justices of the Bombay High Court
20th-century Indian lawyers
21st-century Indian judges